Gabriel Alejandro Cichero Konarek (born 25 April 1984) is a Venezuelan former professional who played as a centre-back or left back.

Personal life
He is the son of Mauro Cichero who was a professional football player and represented Venezuela in the 1980 Olympics.  His brothers, Alejandro and Mauro, are also professional football players.

Club career
Cichero began his professional career with Uruguayan Primera División side Montevideo Wanderers, appearing in 35 matches and scoring 1 goal. During January 2006 transfer window he was loaned to Serie A side U.S. Lecce for the remainder of the season. He then returned to Uruguay and in 2007 was transferred to Vihren Sandanski, in the Bulgarian championship. Following his stay in Bulgaria Cichero returned to his native Venezuela and signed with Deportivo Italia.

Cichero was loaned out to New York Red Bulls of Major League Soccer on 11 July 2008 in a deal that was to end in December 2008, but had an option to be extended into 2009. Numerous blunders in the handful of key late-season games he played meant that the loan was never extended and Cichero was not offered a contract. After being released by New York, he was loaned out to Caracas FC for the 2009 season.

Cichero joined Newell's Old Boys on loan for the 2010–11 Argentine Primera División season. He played 23 matches and scored once.

On 4 August 2011, it was confirmed his transfer to French side RC Lens, in a one-year loan with a buy option for two more years.

In 2012, Cichero joined Ligue 2 outfit FC Nantes on a season-long loan deal with an option to make it permanent. Nantes ended the 2012–13 season promoted back to the Ligue 1 and then he signed a permanent deal with the French top-flight team. However, he failed to find a regular first team place in the 2013–14 season and moved to Swiss side FC Sion on 27 January 2014. He was loaned out to Mineros de Guayana on 8 July 2014.

Indian Super League
On 10 August 2017, it was announced that he had been signed by Indian Super League club Delhi Dynamos FC for 2017–18 season. He played 15 matches for the Delhi-based side, which finished 8th in the league table.

International career
Gabriel Cichero has 61 caps for the Venezuela national team, and has scored four goals including the winner against Chile in the 2011 Copa América quarterfinal.

Career statistics
Scores and results list Venezuela's goal tally first, score column indicates score after each Cichero goal.

|+ List of international goals scored by Gabriel Cichero
|-
| style="text-align:center"|1 || 30 April 2008 || Alfonso López, Bucaramanga, Colombia ||  || style="text-align:center"|1–1 || style="text-align:center"|2–5 || Friendly
|-
| style="text-align:center"|2 || 17 July 2011 || Bicentenario, San Juan, Argentina ||  || style="text-align:center"|2–1 || style="text-align:center"|2–1 || 2011 Copa América
|-
| style="text-align:center"|– || 9 September 2014 || International Stadium Yokohama, Japan ||  || style="text-align:center"|2–2 || style="text-align:center"|0–3 CON|| Friendly 
|-
| style="text-align:center"|3 || 27 March 2015 || Catherine Hall Sports Complex, Montego Bay, Jamaica ||  || style="text-align:center"|1–0 || style="text-align:center"|1–2 || Friendly 
|}

Honours
New York Red Bulls
Major League Soccer Western Conference Championship: 2008

Caracas
Venezuelan Primera División: 2009–10
Copa Venezuela: 2009

Nantes
In the 2012–13 Ligue 2 team of the season

References

External links
 
 gazzetta.it profile
 
 Argentine Primera statistics at Fútbol XXI  
 

1984 births
Living people
Venezuelan people of Italian descent
Venezuelan people of Polish descent
Association football fullbacks
Association football central defenders
Venezuelan footballers
Venezuela international footballers
2011 Copa América players
2015 Copa América players
Montevideo Wanderers F.C. players
U.S. Lecce players
OFC Vihren Sandanski players
Deportivo Italia players
New York Red Bulls players
Caracas FC players
Newell's Old Boys footballers
RC Lens players
FC Nantes players
FC Sion players
A.C.C.D. Mineros de Guayana players
Odisha FC players
Asociación Civil Deportivo Lara players
CE L'Hospitalet players
UA Horta players
Serie A players
First Professional Football League (Bulgaria) players
Argentine Primera División players
Venezuelan Primera División players
Major League Soccer players
Ligue 1 players
Ligue 2 players
Indian Super League players
Swiss Super League players
Tercera División players
Venezuelan expatriate footballers
Expatriate footballers in India
Venezuelan expatriate sportspeople in India
Expatriate footballers in Italy
Venezuelan expatriate sportspeople in Italy
Expatriate footballers in Uruguay
Venezuelan expatriate sportspeople in Uruguay
Expatriate footballers in Argentina
Venezuelan expatriate sportspeople in Argentina
Expatriate footballers in Bulgaria
Venezuelan expatriate sportspeople in Bulgaria
Expatriate footballers in France
Venezuelan expatriate sportspeople in France
Expatriate footballers in Switzerland
Venezuelan expatriate sportspeople in Switzerland
Expatriate soccer players in the United States
Venezuelan expatriate sportspeople in the United States
Expatriate footballers in Spain
Venezuelan expatriate sportspeople in Spain